Richard Vagg (born 27 September 1967 in Melbourne, Victoria, Australia) is an Australian baseball player. He represented Australia at the 1996 Summer Olympics. Also played for the Melbourne Monarchs in the 1997-98 season.

References

1967 births
Olympic baseball players of Australia
Australian baseball players
Baseball players at the 1996 Summer Olympics
Living people
Sportspeople from Melbourne